Herman Fortunatus, Margrave of Baden-Rodemachern (23 January 1595 in Rastatt – 4 January 1665 in Kastellaun) was Margrave of Baden-Rodemachern.  He was a son of Margrave Edward Fortunatus and Maria of Eicken (d. 21 April 1636), the daughter of Joost of Eicken and Barbara of Moll.

Marriage and issue 
Margrave Herman Fortunatus married his first wife on 18 April 1627.  She was Antonia Elisabeth (d. 12 January 1635), a daughter of Count Christopher of Criechingen.  They had the three children:
 Charles William (1627-1666), a canon of Cologne, and the last Margrave of Baden-Rodemachern
 Leopold (1628-1635)
 Maria Sidonia (1635 – 15 August 1686), married on 12 November 1662 to Prince Philip of Hohenzollern-Hechingen (1601 – 13 January 1671)

Margrave Herman Fortunates then married his second wife.  She was Maria Sidonia of Daun-Falkenstein (1605-1675), the daughter of the Count Philip Francis of Falkenstein.  They had two children:
 Philip Balthasar (d. 1662)
 Maria Eleonora Sophia (d. 18 April 1668), married in 1665 with Count John Francis Desideratus of Nassau-Siegen (28 July 1627 – 17 December 1699)

Ancestors

See also 
 List of rulers of Baden

References 
 Johann Christian Sachs: Einleitung in die Geschichte der Marggravschaft und des marggrävlichen altfürstlichen Hauses Baden, part 3, Karlsruhe, 1769,  S. 311-313, 

Margraves of Baden
1595 births
1665 deaths
17th-century German people